Kalle Johansson (born 1997 in Söderåkra) is a Swedish singer. Johansson participated in Melodifestivalen 2015 in the third semifinal with the song "För din skull". He earned a spot in the contest after winning Sveriges Radio's P4 radio competition Svensktoppen Nästa with his song "Den där dan".

References

Living people
1997 births
Swedish pop singers
People from Småland
21st-century Swedish singers
21st-century Swedish male singers
Melodifestivalen contestants of 2015